General Caballero SC is an association football club from Zeballos Cué, Asunción, Paraguay. The club was founded September 6, 1918 and plays in the Primera División B, the third division of the Paraguayan football league.  Their home games are played at the Estadio Hugo Bogado Vaceque which has a capacity of approximately 5,000 seats.

Stadium

The home stadium of the Club General Caballero is the Estadio Hugo Bogado Vaceque, a multi-use stadium in Asunción that was opened in 1918 and holds 5,000 spectators.

Honours
Paraguayan Second Division: 6
1923, 1928, 1962, 1970, 1986, 2010

Paraguayan Third Division: 2
1993, 2000

Federación Paraguaya de Deportes: 1: 1937

Current squad
As of January 7, 2016.

Notable players
To appear in this section a player must have either:
 Played at least 125 games for the club.
 Set a club record or won an individual award while at the club.
 Been part of a national team at any time.
 Played in the first division of any other football association (outside of Paraguay).
 Played in a continental and/or intercontinental competition.

2000's
 Josías Paulo Cardoso Júnior (2005–2006, 2011)
 Aldo Paniagua (2007–08), (2011)
2010's
 Salvador Cabañas (2013)
 Rodderyk Perozo (2016–)
 César Caicedo (2016–)
Non-CONMEBOL players
 Jumpei Shimmura (2010)
 Jim Sek Balg (1988)

References

External links
 Official website
 Albigol: General Caballero Info

General Caballero
Football clubs in Asunción
Association football clubs established in 1918
1918 establishments in Paraguay